The list of the coaches of the World Hockey Association lists all head coaches of the World Hockey Association, which led the league during the period of 1972-1979 a team through at least a WHA game.

Alphabetical Listing 
Abbreviations:
 W = Wins, L = Losses, T = Ties, Pts = Points, Win % = Points percentage

Comments: In this table, only the games of the regular season listed.

Sources 
 WHA Coach Register at hockey-reference.com